Cumbedore Parish, Yanda County in Bourke Shire is a civil parish of Yanda County, a cadasteral division of New South Wales;  a Cadastral division of New South Wales.

Geography

The topography is flat with a Köppen climate classification of BsK (hot semi-arid).

The economy in the parish is based on broad acre agriculture, mainly wheat and sheep.

The traditional owners of the area are the Barkindji people,

References

Central West (New South Wales)
Localities in New South Wales
Geography of New South Wales
Populated places in New South Wales